Alhambra is a hamlet in Alberta, Canada within Clearwater County. It is located close to the David Thompson Highway, east of Rocky Mountain House.

The hamlet is located in census division No. 9.  It was first settled in 1906 and the local post office had the name Horseguards. (Horseguards Creek is nearby.)

It was re-named Alhambra when the railroad arrived in 1914.  The community takes its name from Alhambra, in Grenada, Spain, as an attempt to share some of that place's glory.

Demographics 
Alhambra recorded a population of 64 in the 1991 Census of Population conducted by Statistics Canada.

See also 
List of communities in Alberta
List of hamlets in Alberta

References 

Clearwater County, Alberta
Hamlets in Alberta